Stephan Joseph Kornacki (born August 22, 1979) is an American political journalist, writer, and television presenter. Kornacki is a national political correspondent for NBC News. He has written articles for Salon, The New York Observer, The Wall Street Journal, The New York Times, New York Daily News, the New York Post, The Boston Globe, and The Daily Beast. Kornacki is the multimedia anchor and data analyst for much of MSNBC's The Place for Politics campaign coverage, which airs during Election Day in the United States since 2016.

Early life and education
Kornacki was born in Groton, Massachusetts, to Stephan Joseph Kornacki Sr. and Anne Bernadette (Ramonas).  He has an older sister, Kathryn Kornacki, born in January 1978, who is a professor at Caldwell University. He went to Groton-Dunstable Regional High School. Kornacki attended Boston University and graduated with a degree in film and television.

Career
He started his journalism career as a reporter for PoliticsNJ.com, a New Jersey political news site owned by David Wildstein, where he worked from 2002 to 2006. He formerly co-hosted a political news series on News 12 New Jersey and reported on the U.S. Congress for Roll Call. His articles have been published in the New York Observer, The Wall Street Journal, The New York Times, the New York Daily News, the New York Post, The Boston Globe, and The Daily Beast. He is a former politics editor at Salon.

From 2012 to 2013, Kornacki co-hosted The Cycle on MSNBC with political strategist Krystal Ball, pop-culture commentator Touré Neblett, and conservative columnist S.E. Cupp. He subsequently took over another MSNBC program, Up, airing Saturdays and Sundays from 8 to 10 a.m., starting in April 2013. Since 2014, he has been MSNBC's election coverage map correspondent. Beginning in 2016, Kornacki hosted a daily program from 4 p.m. to 5 p.m., and frequently guest hosts on Hardball with Chris Matthews, All In with Chris Hayes and The Rachel Maddow Show.

On May 8, 2017, Kornacki was named National Political Correspondent for NBC News Group, with plans to continue co-hosting the 4 p.m. edition of MSNBC Live with Nicolle Wallace. He published a book titled The Red and the Blue: The 1990s and the Birth of Political Tribalism in 2018, which chronicles "the polarization of politics". In October 2019, Kornacki began hosting a podcast for NBC News covering the inquiry and first impeachment of Donald Trump called Article II: Inside Impeachment.

Following his work on the 2020 United States presidential election, Kornacki was named by People as one of the sexiest men alive, with his use of Gap khakis eventually becoming a fashion trend on its own, colloquially referred to as "Kornacki Khakis". He was also approached to bring his unique analytic style to the sports division of NBCUniversal, first appearing on Football Night in America in December 2020 to break down playoff scenarios for the remainder of the 2020 NFL season. He would later make appearances on NBC's coverage of the 2021 Kentucky Derby, where he was the only personality to correctly predict Medina Spirit as the apparent winner of the race (although the race win was later given to Mandaloun after a positive drug test by Medina Spirit), and the 2020 Summer Olympics.

Personal life
Kornacki is gay and publicly came out in 2011 through a column in Salon. , he resides in the East Village of Manhattan.

Publications
 The Red and the Blue: The 1990s and the Birth of Political Tribalism (2018). . .

See also
 LGBT culture in New York City
 List of LGBT people from New York City
 New Yorkers in journalism

References

External links
 Steve Kornacki's columns at Salon
 SteveKornacki.blogspot.com
 Beer and Loathing with Steve Kornacki podcast
 
 Kornacki moves to daytime MSNBC

1979 births
20th-century American LGBT people
21st-century American journalists
21st-century American non-fiction writers
21st-century American LGBT people
American business and financial journalists
American gay writers
American male journalists
American people of Polish descent
American television personalities
Male television personalities
Boston University alumni
American LGBT broadcasters
American LGBT journalists
LGBT people from Massachusetts
Living people
MSNBC people
People from the East Village, Manhattan
People from Groton, Massachusetts
Salon (website) people
Writers from Manhattan